Richard Velazquez is a nationally recognized leader in the Hispanic community and in business. Velazquez leads international marketing for Amazon Alexa for Latin America and Australia/New Zealand, and the Smart TV segment. Prior to this, Velazquez was the Global Head of Denon at Sound United,  an automotive designer, President of the National Society of Hispanic MBAs (NSHMBA) Seattle Chapter, Sr. Global Product Planner / Product Manager for Xbox with the Interactive Entertainment Business at Microsoft, and an executive at PepsiCo leading Emerging Technologies and Innovations in Marketing and Global R&D. He was recognized in October 2000 as the 1st Puerto Rican automotive designer for Porsche in Germany.

Education 
Velazquez graduated from Edward R. Murrow High School in Brooklyn, New York, a high school designated as a school of excellence by the United States Department of Education.  He graduated from high school at an accelerated pace, skipping his Junior year and completing the entire high school curriculum in only 3 years.  Velazquez received a Bachelor of Engineering in Mechanical Engineering in 1994 from the Cooper Union for the Advancement of Science and Art, a prestigious specialty school that grants each successful applicant a full-tuition scholarship.  Velazquez then received a Master's of Business Administration from the University of California, Berkeley, Haas School of Business in 2003 on a full-fellowship through the Consortium for Graduate Study in Management (CGSM).

Career 
Velazquez began his career as an automotive designer for Honda R&D Americas, Inc. followed by Porsche AG in Stuttgart, Germany.  After receiving his MBA, he switched industries and careers, focusing on marketing and Product Planning beginning with Procter & Gamble in Puerto Rico, followed by Microsoft and PepsiCo.

Automotive design 
Velazquez's automotive design background began while still studying at Cooper Union.  He designed utility truck bodies for the Brooklyn Union Gas fleet and competed in the Society of Automotive Engineers (SAE) Mini-Baja East competition.  For the Mini-Baja, he designed and built an all-terrain, amphibious vehicle as part of the competition.  After Cooper Union, he began work as a Body Design Engineer for Honda R&D Americas, Inc. in 1995 located in Raymond, Ohio. He worked on the designs of the 1997 Acura CL (new model introduction), 1998 Honda Accord Coupe (complete redesign), 2001 Acura CL (complete redesign) and the 2001 Acura MDX (new model introduction).

Velazquez left Honda in 1999 to work for Porsche AG at a newly designed facility in Weissach, Germany to work on Porsche's first SUV, the 2002 Porsche Cayenne (new model introduction).  Velazquez went on to work on the designs of the 2003 Porsche 911 (major model change) and the 2004 Porsche Boxster (minor model redesign).

In 2001, Velazquez left automotive design to pursue an MBA at the University of California, Berkeley, Haas School of Business.  During the program, he continued to work in the automotive industry, this time as a consultant for Ford de Mexico in the International Business Development (IBD) program evaluating the strategy for Ford's Supplier Park in Hermosillo, Mexico.

Marketing and Product Management 
After Berkeley, Velazquez switched to a marketing role with the Procter and Gamble Commercial Company in Guaynabo, Puerto Rico in 2004.  As an Assistant Brand Manager, he focused on marketing consumer packaged goods to the U.S. Hispanic and Puerto Rican markets.  He was later recruited by Microsoft's Corporate Marketing Group and relocated to Redmond, Washington.  In the Corporate Marketing Group, he worked as a Senior Market Research Manager.  He transferred to the Product Planning group at Xbox in July, 2006.  He served as guest lecturer at the University of Washington in the areas of Marketing and New Product Development and Design.  In 2011, he relocated to New York City for an executive position at PepsiCo. In 2017, he relocated near San Diego to take on the newly formed role of Global Head of Brand for Denon at Sound United.

Community and professional organizations 
Velazquez's involvement in professional and community organizations began at the Cooper Union, as one of the founders and the Treasurer for the Society of Hispanic Professional Engineers (SHPE) Cooper Union Student Chapter.

While at Honda, he served as the Vice Chair for Region VI of the SHPE National Student Affairs Committee, Vice Chairman for Columbus of the Society of Automotive Engineers Dayton Section, and Chairman of SAE Midwest Mini-Baja Competition.  He also founded the Columbus Chapter of the SHPE and served as president until leaving for Germany.

At Berkeley, he founded the Hispanic MBA Student Association. In Puerto Rico, he was elected President of the local chapter of the National Society of Hispanic MBAs.  After arriving at Microsoft, he co-founded the Seattle Chapter of the National Society of Hispanic MBAs.  He served as Executive Vice President of NSHMBA Seattle Chapter in 2005-2006 and has served as President of the Chapter from 2008 until his relocation to New York in 2011.

Velazquez was inducted into the Latino Leaders Magazine Club Leaders of the Future for New York in 2012.  He was also inducted into the Diversity MBA Magazine Top 100 Under 50 Executive and Emerging Leaders in 2011.  Velazquez was recognized as a Rising Star for the NSHMBA national organization in 2009 and received both a Brillante award and Distinguished Lifetime Leader award from the same organization.  Also in 2009, Velazquez was selected as a Puget Sound Business Journal 40 under 40 Honoree.  "Puget Sound Business Journal's 40 Under 40 program is the region's premier award program that spotlights the top business leaders under the age of 40 who excel in their industry and show dynamic leadership."  Velazquez was a regular contributor to the business and economy section of tú Decides Newspaper, a bi-lingual English/Spanish newspaper in Washington state. He was also featured in the February/March 2010 issue of Latino Leaders magazine.

Career timeline 
1990 - 1994     The Cooper Union for the Advancement of Science and Art, B.E. Mechanical Engineering 
1994 - 1995 	The Cooper Union for the Advancement of Science and Art, M.E. Mechanical Engineering 
1995 - 1999	Honda R&D Americas, Inc. – Body Design Engineer 
1995–1999	SHPE Region VI Vice Chair – National Student Affairs Committee (NSAC)
1996–1997	Society of Automotive Engineers Midwest Mini-Baja Chairman 
1997 - 1999	President and Founder, Society of Hispanic Professional Engineers (SHPE) Columbus Chapter 
1997–1999	Society of Automotive Engineers (SAE) Dayton Section - Vice Chairman Columbus 
1999 - 2001	Porsche AG, Weissach, Germany – Automotive Design Engineer 
2001–2003	The University of California, Berkeley, Haas School of Business, MBA
2001–2003	Founder and President, Hispanic MBA Student Association, UC Berkeley, Haas 
2004		The Procter & Gamble Commercial Company, Guaynabo, Puerto Rico – Assistant Brand Manager 
2004 - 2006	Microsoft (Corporate Marketing Group) – Senior Market Research Manager 
2005		Co-founder, National Society of Hispanic MBAs Seattle Chapter 
2006 – 2011	Microsoft, Interactive Entertainment Business, Sr. Product Planning Manager / Sr. Global Product Manager, Xbox 
2009 - 2011  University of Washington Bothell Business Advisory Council Member 
2008 – 2011	President, NSHMBA Seattle Chapter 
2011 - 2017   PepsiCo, R&D Division, Sr. Global Director of Strategic Innovations, Sr. Global Director - Emerging Tech and Innovations 
2017– 2018 Sound United, Global Head of Brand - Denon 
2018–Present    Founder and Director, Sound Start: A Sound United Foundation

Awards
 1997	Young Engineer of the Year Award – American Society of Mechanical Engineers Central Ohio Section
 1999	ASME International Old Guard Young Engineer of the Year Nominee
 2006	Microsoft Corporate Marketing Group MVP
 2008	Peter E. Haas Public Service Award Nominee, University of California, Berkeley
 2008  Microsoft Gold Star Award
 2009	National Society of Hispanic MBAs (NSHMBA) Rising Star
 2009 Puget Sound Business Journal 40 under 40 Honoree 
 2009  National Society of Hispanic MBAs (NSHMBA) Brillante Award for Excellence
 2010  National Society of Hispanic MBAs (NSHMBA) Distinguished Leadership Award 
 2010 Hispanic Association on Corporate Responsibility (HACR) Young Hispanic Corporate Achiever Award (YHCA)
 2011  Diversity MBA Magazine Top 100 under 50 Executives and Emerging Leaders Award
 2012  Latino Leaders Magazine Club Leaders of the Future Honoree

See also 

 List of notable Puerto Ricans

References 

Living people
21st-century American businesspeople
People from Brooklyn
American automobile designers
Haas School of Business alumni
People from Redmond, Washington
Cooper Union alumni
1973 births
American people of Puerto Rican descent
Edward R. Murrow High School alumni